Moradabad-e Kolah Siah (also Romanized as Morādābād-e Kolāh Sīāh; also known as Morādābād) is a village in Dasht-e Arzhan Rural District, Arzhan District, Shiraz County, Fars Province, Iran. At the 2006 census, its population was 35, in 13 families.

References 

Populated places in Shiraz County